Campostoma, the stonerollers, is a genus of cyprinid fish found in North America. There are currently six species recognized for this genus.

Species
 Campostoma anomalum (Rafinesque, 1820) (Central stoneroller)
 Campostoma oligolepis C. L. Hubbs & Greene, 1935 (Largescale stoneroller)
 Campostoma ornatum Girard, 1856 (Mexican stoneroller)
 Campostoma pauciradii Burr & Cashner, 1983 (Bluefin stoneroller)
 Campostoma pullum (Agassiz, 1854)
 Campostoma spadiceum (Girard, 1856) (Highland stoneroller)

References

 
Fish of North America